Yannick Murphy is an American novelist and short story writer. She is a recipient of the Whiting Award, National Endowment for the Arts award, Chesterfield Screenwriting award, MacDowell Colony fellowship, and the Laurence L. & Thomas Winship/PEN New England Award.

Life
She grew up in Greenwich Village, New York.  She attended P.S. 41, I.S. 70, and Stuyvesant High School where she took a class with Frank McCourt.  She graduated with a B.A. from Hampshire College and an M.A. in English from New York University and studied with Gordon Lish. She lived in New York and California.  She now lives in Vermont, with her husband, a horse doctor, and their three children.  Her PEN New England Award winning novel The Call is based on her husband's life as a large animal veterinarian.

Awards
 1988 National Endowment for the Arts Literature Fellowships
 1990 Whiting Award
 2012 Laurence L. & Thomas Winship/PEN New England Award for The Call
 Chesterfield Screenwriting award
 MacDowell Colony fellowship

Works

Books

Children's Books

Anthologies
Pushcart Prize XXXIX 2014, Pushcart Press (November 12, 2014) 
Best Non-Required Reading 2009, Mariner Books (October 8, 2009)  
The O. Henry Prize Stories 2007, Anchor Books (May 8, 2007)

Stories
"Now is the Time", Big, Big Wednesday, 2017
"The Prescription", The Literary Review, 2016
"Too Much for Adele", Conjunctions Online, 2016
"Forty Words", Zoetrope, 2016
"Walls", AGNI, 2006
"The Good Word," One Story, Issue 109, September 2008

Essays

 "The Other End of the Line" New York Times Magazine Best of the Lives Column, March 24, 2017
 "A Real Vermonter" New York Times Magazine Lives Column, November 15, 2015
 "Home and Away" New York Times Magazine Lives Column, February 19, 2006
 "The Big Kahuna" Woof!: Writers on Dogs, Penguin Books (August 26, 2009)

References

External links
Author's website
"An Interview with Yannick Murphy", Bookslut, January 2008
"Interview with Yannick Murphy", Emerging Writers Forum, Dan Wickett, 5/23/2006
"An Interview with Yannick Murphy", Hobart, July 2008
"Bookworm: Yannick Murphy", KCRW, June 15, 2006, Michael Silverblatt
 The Bat Segundo Show (radio interviews): 2006 (34 minutes), 2007 (34 minutes), 2011 (27 minutes)
 http://nyjournalofbooks.com/author/yannick-murphy [Author profile and link to book review]
Profile at The Whiting Foundation

20th-century American novelists
21st-century American novelists
American women novelists
American women short story writers
Living people
New York University alumni
20th-century American women writers
21st-century American women writers
20th-century American short story writers
21st-century American short story writers
Year of birth missing (living people)